United Nations Security Council Resolution 2073 was unanimously adopted on 7 November 2012.

See also 
List of United Nations Security Council Resolutions 2001 to 2100

References

External links
Text of the Resolution at undocs.org

2012 United Nations Security Council resolutions
 2073
2012 in Somalia
November 2012 events